The Colgate Raiders baseball team was a college baseball team fielded by Colgate University from 1886 until 1996.  The university announced the shuttering of the program in 1993 due to Title IX equity concerns.

The Raiders played in the NCAA Division I Baseball Championship four times, reaching the College World Series in 1955.  Fifteen players from Colgate later played in Major League Baseball.

References